Francesco Maria, Principe Ruspoli (November 30, 1839 – January 23, 1907) was the 6th Principe di Cerveteri, 6th Marchese di Riano, 11th Conte di Vignanello and Prince of the Holy Roman Empire, son of Giovanni Nepomucene Ruspoli, 5th Prince of Cerveteri and wife Barbara dei Principi Massimo.

Marriage and children 
He married in Pisa, April 20, 1868 Egle dei Conti Franceschi (Pisa, December 23, 1846 – Rome, February 28, 1913), by whom he had five children:

 Alessandro Ruspoli, 7th Prince of Cerveteri
 Don Giovanni Nepomuceno dei Principi Ruspoli (Rome, May 18, 1871 – Rome, June 12, 1955), unmarried and without issue
 Donna Laura dei Principi Ruspoli (Rome, August 14, 1878 – Rome, September 13, 1960), married in Rome, August 24, 1899 Alessandro, Conte Martini-Marescotti (Pisa, August 12, 1871 – Rome, January 6, 1941), and had issue
 Donna Maria dei Principi Ruspoli (Rome, January 21, 1874 – Rome, February 15, 1929), unmarried and without issue
 Donna Giacinta dei Principi Ruspoli (Rome, August 17, 1883 – Rome, April 4, 1909), unmarried and without issue

See also 
 Ruspoli

External links 
 Francesco Maria Ruspoli on a genealogical site

1839 births
1907 deaths
Francesco
Francesco Maria
Nobility from Rome